Vienna is a city in and the county seat of Maries County, Missouri, United States. Its population was 581 at the 2020 census.

History
Vienna became the county seat in 1855. It was named after Vienna, the capital of Austria. According to folk etymology, the town was named after Vie Anna, the deceased daughter of a county judge. A post office called Vienna has been in operation since 1856.

The Maries County Jail and Sheriff's House was added to the National Register of Historic Places in 2002.

Geography
Vienna is located at the intersection of US Route 63 and Missouri Route 42. The city lies between the Gasconade River, two miles to the east and Maries River about two miles to the west. Rolla is approximately 18 miles to the southeast.

Demographics

2010 census
As of the census of 2010, there were 610 people, 264 households, and 134 families living in the city. The racial makeup of the city was 98.4% White, 0.2% African American, 0.7% Native American, and 0.8% from two or more races. Hispanic or Latino of any race were 0.5% of the population.

There were 264 households, of which 23.5% had children under the age of 18 living with them, 37.9% were married couples living together, 8.0% had a female householder with no husband present, 4.9% had a male householder with no wife present, and 49.2% were non-families. 47.0% of all households were made up of individuals, and 31.1% had someone living alone who was 65 years of age or older. The average household size was 2.06 and the average family size was 2.88.

The median age in the city was 47.3 years. 20.8% of residents were under the age of 18; 7.7% were between the ages of 18 and 24; 18.9% were from 25 to 44; 23.9% were from 45 to 64; and 28.9% were 65 years of age or older. The gender makeup of the city was 47.5% male and 52.5% female.

2000 census
As of the census of 2000, there were 628 people, 257 households, and 139 families living in the city. The population density was 594.0 people per square mile (228.7/km). There were 297 housing units at an average density of 280.9 per square mile (108.2/km). The racial makeup of the city was 98.73% White, 0.48% Native American, 0.16% Asian, and 0.64% from two or more races.

There were 257 households, out of which 24.1% had children under the age of 18 living with them, 38.5% were married couples living together, 9.7% had a female householder with no husband present, and 45.9% were non-families. 44.4% of all households were made up of individuals, and 27.6% had someone living alone who was 65 years of age or older. The average household size was 2.11 and the average family size was 2.94.

In the city, the population was spread out, with 20.1% under the age of 18, 9.9% from 18 to 24, 21.8% from 25 to 44, 17.5% from 45 to 64, and 30.7% who were 65 years of age or older. The median age was 43 years. For every 100 females, there were 79.4 males. For every 100 females age 18 and over, there were 72.5 males.

The median income for a household in the city was $23,456, and the median income for a family was $36,250. Males had a median income of $24,722 versus $20,000 for females. The per capita income for the city was $13,682. About 4.4% of families and 8.1% of the population were below the poverty line, including 2.2% of those under age 18 and 10.4% of those age 65 or over.

Education
Maries County R-I School District operates one elementary school in the community and Vienna High School.

Vienna has a public library, a branch of the Heartland Regional Library System.

References

External links
 Historic maps of Vienna in the Sanborn Maps of Missouri Collection at the University of Missouri

Cities in Maries County, Missouri
Cities in Missouri
County seats in Missouri